Compsoctena pantherina is a moth in the Eriocottidae family. It was described by Sobczyk in 2012. It is found in Indonesia (Sumatra, Kalimantan).

References

Moths described in 2012
Compsoctena
Moths of Indonesia